This article contains a list of fossil-bearing stratigraphic units in the state of New Mexico, U.S.

Sites

See also

 Paleontology in New Mexico

References

 

New Mexico
Stratigraphic units
Stratigraphy of New Mexico
New Mexico geography-related lists
United States geology-related lists